Ayobami Akinwale (1946 – 13 September 2020) was a Nigerian actor, producer, and academic.

Early life and career
He was born in Ibadan and attended Methodist High School and the University of Ibadan before commencing academic work as a lecturer at the Polytechnic Ibadan. He was the Dean, of the Faculty of Arts and Culture of University of Ilorin. He was also the chairman of Oyo State Council for Arts and Culture. He has been a judge at several cultural festivals across Nigeria. He began his acting career in the 1970s featuring in television and drama productions. He won the Best Indigenous actor award at the 4th Africa Movie Academy Awards.

Death 
He died due to a brief illness in the University of Ilorin Teaching Hospital at the age of 74.

Selected filmography
Sango (1997)Ladepo Omo Adanwo (2005)Iranse Aje (2007)Diamonds In The Sky'' (2019)

References

External links 
Ayo Akinwale at the Internet Movie Database  
Ayo Akinwale in University of Ilorin

1946 births
2020 deaths
Nigerian male film actors
Academic staff of the University of Ilorin
Best Actor Africa Movie Academy Award winners
20th-century Nigerian male actors
21st-century Nigerian male actors
Male actors from Ibadan
Yoruba male actors
Academic staff of The Polytechnic, Ibadan
University of Ibadan alumni
Male actors in Yoruba cinema